Renata Dąbrowska (born 8 February 1989) is a Polish track racing cyclist.

She competed at the 2009 UCI Track Cycling World Championships in four disciplines and at the 2010 UCI Track Cycling World Championships in five disciplines. She won at the 2010 European Track Championships (under-23) the scratch.

Career results
2008
2nd  Team Sprint, UEC European U23 Track Championships (with Marta Janowiak)
2009
UEC European U23 Track Championships
2nd  Keirin 
3rd  Team Sprint (with Marta Janowiak)
2010
UEC European U23 Track Championships
1st Scratch Race
2nd Team Pursuit (with Katarzyna Pawłowska and Małgorzata Wojtyra)

References

External links

1989 births
Polish track cyclists
Polish female cyclists
Living people
Place of birth missing (living people)
21st-century Polish women